Michael Ethan Rodgers (born 8 May 1969) is a Scottish actor and acting coach.

Early life
Michael Ethan Rodgers was born in Whitburn, West Lothian, Scotland on 8 May 1969.

Career
Rodgers moved to Los Angeles, California in 1989 to pursue his acting career.

He began his film career with a role in Gia with Angelina Jolie. Shortly thereafter, he went to work with Sir Nigel Hawthorne and Minnie Driver in the feature film Uncorked and renowned director Allison Anders in Sugar Town. He later played alongside Mel Gibson in The Patriot and with Alec Baldwin and Peter Fonda in Thomas and the Magic Railroad in which he played Mr C. Junior. He is best known for playing the acerbic Richard Dawson in the Bob Crane biopic, Auto Focus, directed by Paul Schrader. He runs Michael Rodgers Studio in Milan, Italy, an acting school.

He has appeared on various television series including NYPD Blue, Bones, CSI: Miami, Veronica Mars, American Dreams, Windfall, Will & Grace and the 2010 series Leverage and Mysterious Ways. He also provided the English voice of Judge Gabranth in Final Fantasy XII.

Filmography

Film

Television

Video games

References

External links
 
 https://web.archive.org/web/20070510112444/http://profile.myspace.com/index.cfm?fuseaction=user.viewprofile
 http://palomapigeon.livejournal.com
 https://sites.google.com/site/michaelerodgersfansite/

1969 births
Living people
20th-century Scottish male actors
21st-century Scottish male actors
People from Whitburn, West Lothian
Scottish expatriates in the United States
Scottish male film actors
Scottish male television actors
Scottish male video game actors
Scottish male voice actors